Georgi Kulikov refers to:

 Georgi Kulikov (swimmer) (born 1947), Latvian swimmer
 Georgi Kulikov (actor) (1924–1995), Russian actor